

Poli can refer to:

Food
 Puran Poli, a poli made up of wheat flour and puran (sweet cooked gram paste)
 A Marathi name for chapati, a bread made up of wheat flour

Organisations
 FC Timişoara Romanian first league football club
 FC Politehnica Iasi Romanian first league football club
 A shortname of the Instituto Politécnico Superior
 A shortname for the National Polytechnic Institute (Instituto Politécnico Nacional) the second largest university in Mexico
 Poli payments, an online payment service direct from consumer bank accounts in UK, Australia, New Zealand, and South Africa

People
 Poli (given name), people named Poli
 Poli (surname), people surnamed Poli
 Poli (footballer) (Hipólito Fernández Serrano, born 1977), Spanish footballer who currently plays for Recreativo de Huelva

Places
 Poli, Cameroon
 Poli, Jiaonan (泊里镇), town in Shandong, China
 Poli, Andika, a village in Khuzestan Province, Iran
 Poli, Lali, a village in Khuzestan Province, Iran
 Poli, Lazio, Italy
 Poli, the plural form of polis
 Shortened version of Kōnstantinoúpolis (Constantinople), medieval name for Istanbul
 Poli (Tanzanian ward), a ward in Tanzania
 Poli's Palace Theater, was a movie picture palace built in 1922 by Sylvester Z. Poli in Waterbury, Connecticut. Poli also had a chain of theatres throughout the United States.

Other uses
 POLI, human gene
 Don Poli (foaled 21 April 2009), Irish thoroughbred racehorse
 Short for Politics or Political Science
 Robocar Poli, a cartoon made in 2011